A toothbrush is an oral hygiene instrument.

Toothbrush may also refer to:

Toothbrush moustache, a moustache style
"Toothbrush" (Maalaala Mo Kaya), a 2016 episode about Leni Robredo
"Toothbrush" (song), a 2016 song by DNCE
Toothbrush (album) by Dr. Dog, 2002